Anduud City FC is a professional football club from Ulaanbaatar, Mongolia currently playing in the Mongolian National Premier League.

History
The club was established in July 2013. In 2016 the club finished in fourth place in the National Amateur Cup and won the right to compete in the Mongolian 1st League. The team won the league championship that season and qualified for the Mongolian Premier League for the 2017 season.

The club was named Goyo FC until the 2018 season. At that time the team was renamed Anduud City Club as part of a major sponsorship commitment to modernize and professionalize the club. They won their first match under their new name in May 2018 against Khangarid FC with the only goal scored by Batbayar Khash-Erdene.

Domestic history

Players

Current squad

Managerial history

References

External links
Official Facebook
MFF profile
Soccerway profile

Football clubs in Mongolia
Association football clubs established in 2013
2013 establishments in Mongolia